The Batova is a river in northeastern Bulgaria. The river flows in a wide valley between the Dobruja plateau to the north and the Franga plateau to the south, ultimately flowing directly into the Black Sea. The Batova is only 39 kilometres long, but it is notable as the only river in Southern Dobruja that does not run dry on an annual basis. The river is deep between November and May, with a peak in February, and shallow during the remaining five months, particularly in July and August. The Batova's drainage basin covers 339 square kilometres and its average flow is 340 litres per second. The river passes through the village of Batovo in Dobrichka municipality, Dobrich Province, after which it is named.

According to a report from 2001, the Batova's waters exhibit mid to light pollution.

References 

Rivers of Bulgaria
Landforms of Dobrich Province
Tributaries of the Black Sea